Atelopus pulcher is a species of toad in the family Bufonidae. It is endemic to eastern Peru where it is found in the Huallaga River drainage; its range might extend to Ecuador. Its natural habitats are lowland and premontane tropical forests. It is a diurnal and terrestrial species that breeds in streams.

Description
It has a slender body with quite smooth skin. It is blackish brown above, with various light green markings.

Breeding might occur throughout the year. The tadpole is dorso-ventrally flattened and has a large ventral suction disc behind its mouth. It is similar to other Atelopus tadpoles except that its upper beak is shorter than the lower one.

Conservation
Atelopus pulcher is threatened by chytridiomycosis and habitat loss. It is relatively rare species that is declining in abundance and has disappeared from many known localities. It is sometimes collected for the pet trade, and this might contribute to local declines.

Gallery

References

pulcher
Endemic fauna of Peru
Amphibians of Peru
Amphibians described in 1882
Taxonomy articles created by Polbot
Taxa named by George Albert Boulenger